Spórok  is a village in the administrative district of Gmina Kolonowskie, within Strzelce County, Opole Voivodeship, in south-western Poland.

Since November 2008 Spórok has also officially gone by its pre-war German name of Carmerau.

The village has a population of 667. It is the smallest village in the gmina.

References

Villages in Strzelce County